Filifactor villosus, previously known as Clostridium villosum, is a bacterium belonging to the Bacillota.

References

External links
Type strain of Filifactor villosus at BacDive -  the Bacterial Diversity Metadatabase

Peptostreptococcaceae
Bacteria described in 1979